The H-M-Vehicles Free-Way (H-M meaning high mileage) was a three-wheel microcar manufactured in Burnsville, Minnesota, from 1979 to 1982.

These small commuter cars had a single seat and were powered by a 12 or 16 horsepower gasoline engine or a 4 hp electric motor. A diesel engine was offered, but none were ordered with it.

The 12 HP version was guaranteed to get  when driven at a steady . The standard fuel tank had a capacity of  while a  tank was optional.

The engine was mounted behind the driver and was coupled to a snowmobile-style CVT belt drive transmission. Final drive to the rear wheel was by chain. The gasoline-powered Free-Way did not have a reverse gear in its transmission. An electrically powered reverse drive was offered as an option, but was never made available.

The Free-Way had a welded tubular steel frame, with a secondary perimeter frame at bumper height to protect the driver from impacts. Suspension was fully independent, with two wheels in front and a single wheel in the rear. The lower body included a full undertray to reduce the drag coefficient of the vehicle.

The Free-Way had a single headlight and per federal standards were intended to be licensed as a motorcycle, but in some states they were titled as cars.

About 700 Free-Ways were sold before the company closed in June 1982.

See also 
 List of microcars
 Three-wheeler

References

External links 
 groups.yahoo.com/neo/groups/freewayhmv/info — HM Vehicles Free-Way Yahoo! discussion group
 Free-Way Reunion, Autos & Parts For Sale
  (published 2019-09-26)

Microcars
Defunct motor vehicle manufacturers of the United States
Burnsville, Minnesota
Motor vehicle manufacturers based in Minnesota
Three-wheeled motor vehicles
Cars introduced in 1979
Cars discontinued in 1982